CFAB may refer to:

CFAB, a country format radio station located in Windsor, Nova Scotia
Children and Families Across Borders, a United Kingdom charity